Lee Kwang-Hyun (born 18 July 1981) is a South Korean football player who currently plays with Penang FA in Malaysia Premier League.

Career statistics

References

Korean FA Cup match result 
ifball.com
Lee Kwang-Hyun at footballmalaysia.com

1981 births
Living people
Association football defenders
South Korean footballers
Jeonbuk Hyundai Motors players
Gimcheon Sangmu FC players
Daejeon Hana Citizen FC players
K League 1 players
Penang F.C. players
Expatriate footballers in Malaysia